Kuppivala is a 1965 Indian Malayalam-language film, written by Moidu Padiyath directed by S. S. Rajan and produced by N. Krishnan. The film stars Prem Nazir, Sukumari, Ambika and Bahadoor. It was released on 7 May 1965.

Plot

Cast 
Prem Nazir as Majeed
Sukumari as Pachumma
Ambika as Khadeeja
Bahadoor as Porker/Chellathodu
Kottayam Chellappan as Beeran Sahib
Nilambur Ayisha as Pathiri Amina
Johnson as Muhammedali
Muthukulam Raghavan Pilla as Kittumman
Haji Abdul Rahman as Maulavi
S. Malathi as Vijayamma
Kutty Padmini as Tharabi

Soundtrack

References

External links 
 

1965 films
1960s Malayalam-language films